Jesse Matlack Baker (March 1, 1854 - July 30, 1913) was an American politician from Pennsylvania who served as a Republican member of the Pennsylvania House of Representatives for Delaware County from 1889 to 1892 and the Pennsylvania State Senate for the 9th district from 1893 to 1897.

Early life and education
Baker was born in Parkesburg, Pennsylvania to Jesse and Phebe (Bishop) Matlack.  He attended public schools and entered the Pennsylvania Military Academy in Chester, Pennsylvania.  In 1871, he became a cadet at West Point Military Academy and was honorably discharged in 1873.  He studied law under V. Gilpin Robinson and was accepted to the Delaware County bar in 1881.

Military career
Baker served as Captain of Company H, 6th regiment, Pennsylvania National Guard from 1877 to 1898.  He was a Major in the U.S. Army and served in the Spanish American War in 1898.

Political career
Baker served as district attorney for Delaware County from 1882 to 1888.  He was elected to the Pennsylvania House of Representatives for Delaware County and served from 1888 to 1892.

Baker was elected to the Pennsylvania State Senate for the 9th district in 1892.  He served as chairman of the Military Committee and as a member of Elections, Corporations, Judiciary General and Special, Insurance, Mines and Mining and Legislative Apportionment.

Personal life
Baker died at his home in Media, Pennsylvania on July 30, 1913 after a bout of Bright's disease. He is interred at the Media Cemetery in Upper Providence Township, Pennsylvania.

References

External links

|-

1854 births
1913 deaths
19th-century American lawyers
19th-century American politicians
American lawyers admitted to the practice of law by reading law
American military personnel of the Spanish–American War
Burials at Media Cemetery
County district attorneys in Pennsylvania
Republican Party members of the Pennsylvania House of Representatives
Pennsylvania lawyers
Pennsylvania National Guard personnel
Republican Party Pennsylvania state senators
People from Chester County, Pennsylvania
United States Army officers
United States Military Academy alumni
Widener University alumni